The 2008 BC Lions season was the 51st season for the team in the Canadian Football League and their 55th overall. The Lions finished the season in third place in the West Division with an 11–7 record and appeared in the West Final, losing to the eventual Grey Cup champion Calgary Stampeders.

Offseason

CFL draft
In the 2008 CFL Draft, 48 players were chosen from among 752 eligible players from Canadian universities across the country, as well as Canadian players playing in the NCAA. The first two rounds were broadcast on TSN.ca with host Rod Black.

Preseason

 Games played with white uniforms.

Regular season
 On September 13, Lions running back and former Blue Bomber, Charles Roberts reached over 10,000 rushing yards in his CFL career versus the Saskatchewan Roughriders.
On July 6, Bobby Ackles, an integral member of the B.C. Lions for more than 50 years, died of a heart attack at his family's cabin on Bowen Island. Ackles started with the team as a waterboy in 1954. Ackles was sixty nine years old. Under Ackles' leadership, the Lions captured the Grey Cup in 1985 and in 2006.
 On September 20, an unsportsmanlike incident occurred during a game in Saskatchewan. It started in the fourth quarter when Saskatchewan fans became angry about a B.C. play they thought should have been a face mask penalty. Lions defensive back Dante Marsh fired the ball into the stands, and Saskatchewan fans responded by pelting the Lions with full cans of beer. The incident occurred on the night when the Roughriders were honouring past CFL legend Ron Lancaster, who had recently died at the age of 69.
 On November 1, B.C. Lions kick returner Ian Smart set a new CFL record for most kickoff return yardage.

Season standings

Season schedule

 Games played with colour uniforms.
 Games played with white uniforms.
 Games played with alternate uniforms.

Roster

Player stats

Passing

Rushing

Receiving

Awards and records

 Cameron Wake (DE), British Columbia Lions – CFL's Most Outstanding Defensive Player Award
 Cameron Wake, Norm Fieldgate Trophy

2008 CFL All-Stars

 Brent Johnson, Defensive Tackle
 Aaron Hunt, Defensive Tackle
 Jason Jimenez, Offensive Tackle
 Dante Marsh, Cornerback
 Barron Miles, Safety
 Geroy Simon, Receiver
 Cameron Wake, Defensive End

Western Division All-Star Selections

 Korey Banks, Defensive Back
 Javier Glatt, Linebacker
 Aaron Hunt, Defensive Tackle
 Paris Jackson, Receiver
 Jason Jimenez, Offensive Tackle
 Brent Johnson, Defensive Tackle
 Dante Marsh, Cornerback
 Paul McCallum, Punter
 Barron Miles, Safety
 Rob Murphy, Offensive Tackle
 Geroy Simon, Receiver
 Ian Smart, Special Teams
 Cameron Wake, Defensive End

Playoffs

 Games played with white uniforms.

West Semi-Final
Date and time: Saturday, November 8, 3:30 PM Central Standard TimeVenue: Mosaic Stadium at Taylor Field, Regina, Saskatchewan

West Final
Date and time: Saturday, November 15, 2:30 PM Mountain Standard TimeVenue: McMahon Stadium, Calgary, Alberta

References

BC Lions seasons
BC Lions
2008 in British Columbia